WDNA is the callsign of a class C2 listener supported public radio station operating on 88.9 MHz in Miami, Florida, licensed in 1977 by the FCC to the Bascomb Memorial Broadcasting Foundation, Inc., a non-profit organization.  WDNA is the market's first public radio station not run by any government agency.  It is affiliated with Public Radio International.  The format is a mix of straight-ahead jazz, Latin jazz, world music, and talk.  BBC World Service newscasts are heard atop each hour.

See also
 List of jazz radio stations in the United States
 List of community radio stations in the United States

External links 

Jazz with Bob Parlocha

DNA
Community radio stations in the United States
Jazz radio stations in the United States
Radio stations established in 1977
1977 establishments in Florida